Muḥammad Arshād, was a late 16th-century Bengali Muslim author who wrote in the Persian language. He was a prominent Mawlana that resided in Baniachong. Arshad wrote the Persian book Zaraul Musannif, which made him one of the earliest authors in the Sylhet region.

See also
Syed Shah Israil
Syed Pir Badshah
Syed Rayhan ad-Din

References

People from Baniachong Upazila
Bengali writers
16th-century Persian-language writers
16th-century male writers
16th-century Muslim scholars of Islam
16th-century Indian Muslims
16th-century Indian scholars
16th-century educators
16th-century deaths
16th-century nobility
16th-century Bengalis
16th-century Islamic religious leaders